The Dukes of Dixieland was an American, New Orleans "Dixieland"-style revival band, originally formed in 1948 by brothers Frank Assunto, trumpet; Fred Assunto, trombone; and their father Papa Jac Assunto, trombone and banjo. Their first records featured Jack Maheu, clarinet; Stanley Mendelsohn, piano; Tommy Rundell, drums; and Barney Mallon, tuba and string bass. The 1958 album “Marching Along with the Dukes of Dixieland, Volume 3,” lists Frank, Fred, and Jac Assunto, along with Harold Cooper (clarinet), Stanley Mendelsohn (piano), Paul Ferrara (drums), and Bill Porter (tuna and string bass). During its run the band also featured musicians such as clarinetists Pete Fountain, Jerry Fuller, Kenny Davern, drummers Barrett Deems, Charlie Lodice, Buzzy Drootin and guitarists Jim Hall, and Herb Ellis. The band also recorded with Louis Armstrong.

Fred and Frank Assunto both died young, and the original Dukes of Dixieland disbanded in the early 1970s. In April 1974, producer/manager John Shoup restarted the Dukes of Dixieland with Connie Jones as leader, leased Louis Prima's nightclub atop the Monteleone Hotel in the French Quarter and renamed it "Duke's Place".  The Dukes of Dixieland have not been affiliated with the Assunto family since 1974. The Assunto family has denied giving away permission to use the band name with the new line-ups, none of which have included any of the original musicians.

History 
The original Dukes of Dixieland were featured on the first stereo record, released November 1957, on the Audio Fidelity label. Sidney Frey, founder and president of Audio Fidelity, had Westrex cut the disk for release before any of the major record labels. In 1978, the Dukes, under John Shoup's direction, recorded the first direct-to-disk album, and then, in 1984, were the first jazz band to record on CD. In 1980, they recorded a television special at the old Civic Theater in New Orleans, with the New Orleans Pops Orchestra and later performed in a TV special with Woody Herman, Wood Choppers Ball. In 1986, they invited jazz musician Danny Barker to perform with them at Mahogany Hall to record a television special, Salute to Jelly Roll Morton. In 2001, their gospel CD Gloryland was nominated for a Grammy Award. In 2011, they recorded with The Oak Ridge Boys, in Nashville, Tennessee, titled Country Meets Dixie.

They have performed with symphony orchestras, including the Cincinnati, Cleveland, Chicago, National, New York Pops (in Carnegie Hall), and 29 other orchestras around the world. In 2005, they traveled aboard the Steamboat Natchez up the Mississippi and Ohio Rivers to Cincinnati, Ohio, raising money for the Bush-Clinton Katrina Relief Fund, while many of the band members' homes were still destroyed. In 2011, they performed with the Boston Pops.

Their latest CD, Here Comes the Girls, features music from R&B artists such as The Meters, Ernie K-Doe, and Allen Toussaint.

Lawsuit and controversy over band name 
In a commentary to an article published by The Syncopated Times, Deano Assunto, the son of trumpeter Frank Assunto (of the original Dukes of Dixieland) states: "due to a court settlement against John Shoup there is to be ‘no implying any historical connection’ between Shoup’s copy band and the original pre-1974 Dukes of Dixieland [...] Your article also stated that John Shoup says that Freddie’s widow Betty Assunto gave him the rights to the Dukes of Dixieland name which is not true. In our first lawsuit against Shoup he could provide no documents to prove [that claim]."  The Assunto family now has a popular tribute band, "The Assunto Dukes, a Dixieland Tribute", featuring Frank's granddaughter Lexie on vocals.

Band members

Original members
 Frank Assunto
 Fred Assunto
Duke Assunto
Bill Porter 
 Papa Jac Assunto
 Jack Maheu
 Stanley Mendelsohn
 Tommy Rundell
 Barney Mallon

Featured artists
 Pete Fountain
 Louis Armstrong
 Jerry Fuller
 Jim Hall
 Herb Ellis

Later alumni 
 1959–61 – Rich Matteson
 1966/1967 – Jim Beebe
 1962–63 – Buzzy Drootin
1966/1967 – Eddie Hubble
1964–1967 – Barrett Deems
1960–1967 – Gene Schroeder

1975–80
 Mike Vax
 Dick Johnson
 Billy Menier
 Otis Bazoon
 Al Bernard
 Jerry Mehan
 Bob O'Rourke
 Bill Huntington

1981–85
 Frank Trapani
 Phamous Lambert
 Bobby Floyd
 Freddy Kohlman
 Mike Sizer

1986–89
 Harry Waters
 Mike Waddell (musician)

1990–92
 J.B Scott

1990–2010
 Richard Taylor
 Al Barthlow
 Everett Link
 Ben Smith
 Tim Laughlin
 Kevin Clark
 Earl Bonie
 Mike Fulton
 Jamie Wight
 Tom McDermott

2011–2012
 Kevin Clark
 Ben Smith
 Scott Obenschain
 Ryan Burrage
 Alan Broome
 J.J. Juliano

2013-2013
 Kevin Clark
 Ben Smith
 Scott Obenschain
 Ryan Burrage
 Alan Broome
 Paul Thibodeaux
 Colin Meyers

2013–2014
 Kevin Clark
 Scott Obenschain
 Paul Thibodeaux
 Ryan Burrage
 Alan Broome
 Joe Kennedy

2014–
 Kevin Clark
 Ryan Burrage
 Alan Broome
 Joe Kennedy
 David Mahoney
 David Phy

2016–
 Kevin Clark
 Owen Callahan
 Mike Robbins
 Joe Kennedy
 David Mahoney
 Wes Anderson IV

Guest/featured artists 
 Danny Barker
 Charlie Brent
 George French
 Woody Herman
 Moses Hogan
 Luther Kent
 New Orleans Gospel Choir
 Joe Williams
 The Oak Ridge Boys
 Reed Vaughan
 Karl J. Karlsson
 Francis Grinnell

See also
 Italians in New Orleans

References

Bibliography
Spedale, Rhodes. A Guide to Jazz in New Orleans. p. 135 
Rose, Al. I Remember Jazz. pp. 14, 45, 151, 181  LSU Press
Rose, Al. New Orleans Jazz (A Family Album). pp. 1, 6, 12, 29, 40, 41, 49, 74, 77, 85, 110, 115, 138, 149, 191, 224  LSU Press

External links 
 Official Site of the Original Dukes of Dixieland
 Official Site of the Assunto Dukes Tribute, the Only Band OFFICIALLY and LEGITIMATELY Sanctioned by the Estate of Frank and Freddie Assunto
 US District Court for the Eastern District of Louisiana. Asunto v. Shoup, 132 F. Supp. 2d 445 (E.D. La. 2000). October 13, 2000.
Kevin Ray Clark Interview NAMM Oral History Library (2021)

Dixieland revival ensembles
Dixieland ensembles
Jazz musicians from New Orleans
Audio Fidelity Records artists
Musical groups established in 1948